The Comforts of Madness is the debut studio album by English alternative rock band Pale Saints. It was released on 12 February 1990 by 4AD.

The Comforts of Madness peaked at number 40 on the UK Albums Chart. On 17 January 2020, 4AD released a remastered and expanded reissue of the album for its 30th anniversary.

Critical reception

Reviewing The Comforts of Madness for NME, Simon Williams praised the album as an "unnervingly multi-dimensional collage of melody and friction" with "at least eight Great Pop Tunes, all hooklines and absolutely no stinkers." The magazine later named it the 45th best album of 1990.

In 2016, Pitchfork ranked The Comforts of Madness at number 21 on its list of the 50 best shoegaze albums of all time.

Track listing

Personnel
Credits are adapted from the album's liner notes.

 Pale Saints (Chris Cooper, Ian Masters, and Graeme Naysmith) – all instruments

Production
 Al Clay – engineering (tracks 4, 6–8, 11)
 Tim Davis – engineering assistance (tracks 4, 6–8, 11)
 John Fryer – production (tracks 1–3, 5, 9, 10), engineering (tracks 1–3, 5, 9, 10)
 Gil Norton – production (tracks 4, 6–8, 11)

Design
 Chris Bigg – art direction assistance, design assistance
 Bleddyn Butcher – group photography
 Vaughan Oliver – art direction, design
 Sarah Tucker – cat photography

Charts

References

External links
 

1990 debut albums
Pale Saints albums
Albums produced by John Fryer (producer)
Albums produced by Gil Norton
4AD albums